Acacia holosericea is a shrub native to tropical and inland northern Australia. It is commonly known as soapbush wattle, soapbush, strap wattle, candelabra wattle, silver wattle and silky wattle.

Description
The flowers are rod-like and bright yellow, 3–5 cm long. The seed is edible.

Taxonomy
The species was first formally described by the botanist Allan Cunningham in 1832 as part of George Don's work A General History of Dichlamydeous Plants. It was reclassified as Racosperma holosericeum in 1987 by Leslie Pedley then transferred back to genus Acacia in 2006. Other synonyms include; Acacia holosericea var. glabrata, Acacia holosericea var. multispirea and Acacia mangium var. holosericea. The type specimen was collected by Allan Cunninham in 1819 near Port Keats on the edge of the Cambridge Gulf.

Distribution
The shrub is found in northern parts of Australia in Western Australia, the Northern Territory and Queensland. The range of the bulk of the population extends from around near Derby in the Kimberley region of Western Australia to the east through the top end of the Northern Territory as far as Rockhampton in eastern Queensland. Smaller populations are found in arid regions of the Pilbara in the Hamersley Range, in central parts of the Northern Territory and in southwestern Queensland. It is found in and around ephemeral watercourses growing in gravelly sand or loamy soils.

Cultivation
A. holosericea is available for cultivation by seed, although the seeds must be scarified prior to planting. It grows quickly and well in a sunny, reasonably well drained position in most soil types. It is suitable as a feature plant or as a hedge or screen plant.
It has attractive foliage and fruit and can be grown in tropical areas.

Uses
Indigenous Australians used the plant as a fish poison. The seeds of the plant are known to be edible.

See also
 List of Acacia species

References

External links
 

Bushfood
Edible legumes
Trees of Australia
Flora of Queensland
holosericea
Fabales of Australia
Drought-tolerant trees
Plants described in 1832
Taxa named by Allan Cunningham (botanist)